Birkende Boldklub is a Danish Football club based in Kerteminde municipality in the town Birkende.
The club's best team is currently playing in FBU Serie 3.
But also has two more teams in FBU Serie 5

Their current manager is Ricky Frederiksen.

External links
 Official site

Football clubs in Denmark
Sport in Funen